Ipinanganak Na ang Taong Papatay Sa Iyo is a 2000 Philippine action film written, produced and directed by Roland Ledesma. The film stars Ronald Gan Ledesma, Beth Tamayo and Jimmy Santos.

The film is streaming online on YouTube.

Cast
 Ronald Gan Ledesma as Daniel
 Beth Tamayo as Lina
 Jimmy Santos as Buboy
 Joonee Gamboa as Mang Asyong
 Jaime Fabregas as Don Roque
 Ray Ventura as Ruben
 Daria Ramirez as Leticia
 Bob Soler as Antonio Torres
 Rhey Roldan as Sgt. Lopez
 Brando Legaspi as Johnny
 Yam Ledesma as Delia
 Ervie Mateo as Boyet
 Ervin Mateo as Capt. Reyes

Awards

References

External links

Full Movie on Solar Pictures

2000 films
2000 action films
Filipino-language films
Philippine action films